Edward John Gagnier (April 16, 1882 – September 13, 1946) was an infielder in Major League Baseball in 1914 and 1915. He played the majority of his 114 professional games at shortstop.

Sources

1880s births
1946 deaths
Major League Baseball shortstops
Brooklyn Tip-Tops players
Buffalo Blues players
Major League Baseball players from France
Natchez Indians players
Ottumwa Snappers players
Burlington Flint Hills players
Ottumwa Champs players
Lincoln Ducklings players
Lincoln Treeplanters players
Lincoln Railsplitters players
Indianapolis Indians players
Newark Indians players
Atlanta Crackers players